Bandele Omoniyi (6 November 1884 – 1913) was a Nigerian nationalist who is best known for his book A Defence of the Ethiopian Movement (1908), which urged for political reforms in the colonies, warning that otherwise a revolution in Africa might end British rule. According to Hakim Adi, he is one of the earliest examples of the politically active West African student in Britain.

Biography
Bandele Omoniyi was born in Lagos, in present-day Nigeria, and his parents sold their land to finance his studies in Britain, where Omoniyi first went in 1905. Enrolling at Edinburgh University in 1906 to study law, he eventually gave up his studies as he became increasingly involved in political activities, taking up anti-imperial journalism in socialist, Scottish and Nigerian publications. He wrote to various British politicians, including the Prime Minister, Henry Campbell-Bannerman, and the future Labour Party leader Ramsay MacDonald, demanding representation for Africans in the colonies. In 1907 Omoniyi criticised colonial rule in a series of letters to the Edinburgh Magazine. He also wrote articles for the West African press, and in 1908 published his major work, A Defence of the Ethiopian Movement, in Edinburgh, dedicating it "to The Right Honourable and Honourable Members of the British Parliament".

Omoniyi later moved to Brazil around 1910, where he was subsequently arrested for his political activities. He refused assistance from the British Consul.  Imprisoned, he contracted beriberi and died, aged 28.

References

1884 births
1913 deaths
Alumni of the University of Edinburgh
19th-century Nigerian people
20th-century Nigerian writers
Nigerian expatriates in the United Kingdom
Writers from Lagos
Yoruba writers
Prisoners and detainees of Brazil
Nigerian expatriates in Brazil
English-language writers from Nigeria
Nigerian critics
Anti-imperialism in Africa
Nigerian nationalists
People from colonial Nigeria
Black British history
Prisoners who died in Brazilian detention